Primal Exhale is the first full-length album by the Finnish Power metal band Excalion.

Track listing
 "Temptation Wasteland" - 4:58
 "A Moment in the Spotlight" - 4:13
 "Reality Bends" - 6:32
 "Dire Waters" - 5:13
 "Stage of Lies" - 5:36
 "Heart and Home" - 4:17
 "Megalomania" - 5:53
 "My Legacy" - 5:58
 "Obsession to Prosper" - 7:56
 "Luopio" - European bonustrack
 "Lady Moon" (Demo)- Japanese bonustrack

Credits
Vocals:Jarmo Pääkkönen
Guitar:Kimmo Hänninen
Guitar:Tero Vaaja
Bass:Timo Sahlberg
Keyboards:Jarmo Myllyvirta
Drums:Henri Pirkkalainen

References

External links
 - Official Excalion Discography

Excalion albums
2000 debut albums